In enzymology, a L-arabinose 1-dehydrogenase is an enzyme that catalyzes the chemical reaction

L-arabinose + NAD+  L-arabinono-1,4-lactone + NADH + H+

Thus, the two substrates of this enzyme are L-arabinose and NAD+, whereas its 3 products are L-arabinono-1,4-lactone, NADH, and H+.

This enzyme belongs to the family of oxidoreductases, specifically those acting on the CH-OH group of donor with NAD+ or NADP+ as acceptor. The systematic name of this enzyme class is L-arabinose:NAD+ 1-oxidoreductase. This enzyme participates in ascorbate and aldarate metabolism.

References 

 

EC 1.1.1
NADH-dependent enzymes
Enzymes of unknown structure